PTX, Vols. 1 & 2 is the fourth release by Pentatonix, first released on July 30, 2014, in Japan. Considered their first official studio album, it is a compilation of all sixteen recordings from their two namesake EPs (PTX, Vol. I and PTX, Vol. II), as well as three tracks previously released as singles.

The Japanese version contains an exclusive cover of "Let It Go" (which was later released in the US on their Christmas album, That's Christmas to Me), the only previously unreleased track of the album. PTX, Vols. 1 & 2 is the first Pentatonix album released under their new label, RCA Records.

It was released in Australia on August 15, 2014, and in Korea on August 28, 2014, and subsequently in the Philippines on September 26, 2014. The Australian edition features roughly the same cover but is colored blue with "Australian Edition" beneath the graphic. On the Philippines edition, the center graphic is shaded with red (left portion), yellow (center portion) and blue (right portion) which match the colors on the flag of the Philippines and it has "Philippines Edition" beneath the graphic. On the Korean edition, the center design is shaded with a gradient fade of red, to white, to blue, matching the colors of both the North and South Korean flags with "Korea Edition" printed below it.

Track listing

References

Pentatonix albums
2014 debut albums
RCA Records albums
Covers albums